Mikko Hyyrynen (born 1 November 1977) is a Finnish former professional footballer who played as a striker.

Career
Born in Lappeenranta, Hyyrynen debuted in Veikkausliiga for FC Lahti in 2001 but did not make his real breakthrough into top-flight football until the 2003 season when he was playing for the newly promoted TPS. He stayed at TPS for five seasons before moving on to MyPa and then FF Jaro. In winter 2009 he signed a two-year contract with JJK. He guided his new team to the Finnish League Cup 2010 final, where they lost to FC Honka on penalties. He scored his 50th Veikkausliiga goal in a 3–2 win over FC Honka on 23 August 2010.

After the 2011 season his contract with JJK expired and he returned to Turku, to sign a one-year contract with TPS, a club which he presented between 2002–2006.

Hyyrynen was capped twice for the Finland national team in friendly matches against Kuwait and Saudi Arabia in March 2005 but was not called up later.

In October 2017, he announced he would retire from professional football at the end of the season and would play his final match on 21 October.

Notes

External links

 
Veikkausliiga Hall of Fame 

1977 births
Living people
People from Lappeenranta
Sportspeople from South Karelia
Finnish footballers
Association football forwards
Finland international footballers
JJK Jyväskylä players
FF Jaro players
Myllykosken Pallo −47 players
FC Lahti players
Veikkausliiga players